Loraine is a feminine given name that is a modern form of the Germanic Chlothar (which is a blended form of Hlūdaz and Harjaz). It is a name that originates from the French region of Lorraine. Notable people known by this name include the following:

Given name

Loraine Baricchi, part of the Luca and Loraine Baricchi ballroom dance pair
Loraine Barry (born 1964), Irish dancer
 Loraine Boettner (1901–1990), American theologian and author
Loraine Braham (born 1938), Australian politician
Loraine Despres, American novelist and screenwriter
Loraine Gonzales (born 1977), American Wheelchair basketball player
 Loraine Hutchins, American author
Loraine Mellor, British Methodist Minister
Loraine Obler, American neuroscientist
Loraine Seville, known by the stage name Raine Seville, (born 1986), Jamaican dancehall and reggae artist
Loraine Victor (born 1948), South African lawn bowler
 Loraine Wyman (1885–1937), American soprano

Middle name
Beverly Loraine Greene (1915 – 1957), American architect
Charles Loraine Smith (1751 – 1835), English sportsman, artist and politician
Ella Loraine Dorsey (1853 – 1935), American author, journalist, and translator
Francis Loraine Petre (1852 – 1925), Scottish civil servant 
George Loraine Stampa (1875–1951), British artist
Sir Henry Loraine Baker, 2nd Baronet (1787 – 1859), British Royal Navy officer
John Loraine Baldwin (1809 – 1896), English cricket enthusiast

Surname
 Eustace Loraine (1879–1912), British aviation pioneer
John Alexander Loraine (1924- 1988), Scottish physician and endocrinologist
Sir Lambton Loraine, 11th Baronet (1838 - 1917), British naval officer,
 Percy Loraine, whose full name is Sir Percy Loraine, 12th Baronet (1880–1961), British diplomat
 Philip Loraine, a pen name of Robin Estridge, aka Robin York, (1920–2002), British author
 Robert Loraine (1876–1935), London and Broadway stage actor, actor-manager and soldier, later a pioneer aviator
 Violet Loraine (1886–1956), English musical theatre actress and singer

See also 

Helen M. McLoraine
Lorraine (given name)
Lorraine (surname)
Rainie (disambiguation)

Notes

English feminine given names